Mansum Israfil oglu Ibrahimov (born October 1, 1960 in İmamqulubəyli, Agdam, Azerbaijani SSR, USSR) is an Azerbaijani mugham singer and actor.

Biography
In 2011, he participated with "Ensemble Garabagh" in WOMEX in Copenhagen, Denmark.

In 2013, Ibrahimov with Ensemble Garabagh visited Austria to give 3 sold-out concerts for survivors of 2012 East Azerbaijan earthquakes.

References

External links
 

1960 births
Living people
People from Agdam District
20th-century Azerbaijani male singers
Mugham singers
21st-century Azerbaijani male singers